Ptenochirus is a genus of bat in the family Pteropodidae. It contains the following species:

 Greater musky fruit bat, Ptenochirus jagori
 Lesser musky fruit bat, Ptenochirus minor

Both the Ptenochirus jagori and the Ptenochirus minor are considered endemic to the Philippines and are considered to be seed dispersers of diverse trees. 
The Ptenochirus may be protected if the Ficus species, their primary food choice, is conserved.

References

 
Bat genera
Taxa named by Wilhelm Peters
Taxonomy articles created by Polbot